The Croatian Hockey League Season for 2006–2007 was the 16th such season. It was won by KHL Medveščak Zagreb. The season was divided into three parts. The last part determined the champion.

Teams
 KHL Mladost
 KHL Medveščak Zagreb
 KHL Zagreb
 HK Ina Sisak

Legs

First Leg

Second Leg

Third Leg(Championship)

Games
 7 October 2006.  	Medveščak – Mladost  	 5–4  	  (3–1, 2–3, 0–0)
 27 October 2006. 	Mladost – Zagreb 	3–2 	(1–0, 0–2, 2–0)
 2 November 2006. 	Medveščak – Zagreb 	7–1 	(1–0, 4–0, 2–1)
 9 November 2006. 	Mladost – Medveščak 	4–6 	(0–2, 1–3, 3–1)
 12 November 2006. 	Zagreb – Medveščak 	3–7 	(2–2, 0–4, 1–1)
 7 December 2006. 	Zagreb – Mladost 	11–3 	(3–2, 1–0, 7–1)
 27 December 2006. 	Medveščak – Zagreb 	11–2 	(5–0, 1–1, 5–1)
 3 January 2007. 	Mladost – Zagreb 	5–4 	(2–2, 1–2, 2–0)
 22 January 2007. 	INA – Medveščak 	5–27 	(0–8, 2–7, 3–12)
 23 January 2007. 	Zagreb – Medveščak 	7–12 	(1–5, 3–4, 3–3)
 24 January 2007. 	INA – Mladost 	2–18 	(1–6, 1–6, 0–6)
 26 January 2007. 	INA – Zagreb 	4–13 	(0–3, 2–7, 2–3)
 29 January 2007. 	Zagreb – Mladost 	6–2 	(1–1, 4–1, 1–0)
 30 January 2007. 	Medveščak – INA 	23–3 	(6–0, 7–1, 10–2)
 1 February 2007. 	Mladost – INA 	23–2 	(10–0, 7–1, 6–1)
 2 February 2007. 	Mladost – Medveščak 	1–6 	(0–2, 0–3, 1–1)
 3 February 2007. 	Zagreb – INA 	19–0 	(4–0, 8–0, 7–0)
 13 February 2007. 	Medveščak – Mladost 	12–2 	(2–0, 6–1, 4–1)
 17 February 2007. 	Medveščak – Zagreb 	2–2 	(1–2, 1–0, 0–0)
 20 February 2007. 	Medveščak-Mladost 	10–4 	(3–0, 2–3, 5–1)
 23 February 2007. 	Zagreb-Mladost 	1–4 	(0–0, 1–1, 0–3)
 25 February 2007. 	Zagreb-Medveščak 	0–7 	(0–4, 0–1, 0–2)
 27 February 2007. 	Mladost – Medveščak 	2–4 	(0–1, 1–1, 1–2)
 5 March 2007. 	Mladost-Zagreb 	8–6 	(5–4, 1–1, 2–1)

Croatian Ice Hockey League
1
Croatian Ice Hockey League seasons